Marcus Christensen (born April 2, 1970) is a Canadian former competitive figure skater. He is the 1988 Grand Prix International St. Gervais champion, the 1988 Nebelhorn Trophy silver medalist, the 1992 Prague Skate bronze medalist, and a three-time Canadian national medalist (silver in 1995, bronze in 1993 and 1996). Christensen's highest ISU Championship placements were ninth at the 1988 Junior Worlds in Brisbane and tenth at the 1993 Worlds in Prague. He was coached by Louis Stong, Marijane Stong, and Paul Martini.

After retiring from competition, Christensen became a skating coach.

Programs

Results

References

Canadian male single skaters
1970 births
Living people
Figure skaters from Toronto